Dmitriy Mikhailovich Dobroskok (born March 1, 1984 in Buzuluk) is a Russian diver. Competing in the 2008 Summer Olympics, he won a bronze medal in the men's synchronized 10 metre platform with teammate Gleb Galperin. He also competed in the 2004 Summer Olympics.

External links
 Bio at 2008 Olympics site

Russian male divers
Olympic divers of Russia
Olympic bronze medalists for Russia
Divers at the 2004 Summer Olympics
Divers at the 2008 Summer Olympics
1984 births
Living people
Olympic medalists in diving
Medalists at the 2008 Summer Olympics
World Aquatics Championships medalists in diving